Birinci Dördyol is a village in the municipality of Təzəkənd in the Agdam District of Azerbaijan.

References

Populated places in Aghdam District